The women's time trial class B track cycling event at the 2020 Summer Paralympics took place on 26 August 2021 in the Izu Velodrome, Japan. This class is for the cyclist who are blind or has visual impairments, they will then ride with tandem bicycles together with a sighted cyclist (also known as the pilot). There were 10 pairs from seven different nations competing.

Competition format
The 10 pairs were divided into their own heats (1 heat including 1 pair). They did a time trial basis where the fastest pair would win gold, second fastest a silver, and third fastest a bronze. The distance of this event was 1000m.

Schedule
All times are Japan Standard Time (UTC+9)

Records

Results

References

Women's time trial B